Donna Vekić was the defending champion, having won the event in 2012, but she chose not to participate.

Nigina Abduraimova won the title, defeating Anastasiya Vasylyeva in the final, 2–6, 6–1, 7–6(7–4).

Seeds

Main draw

Finals

Top half

Bottom half

References 
 Main draw

Fergana Challenger - Women's Singles
2013 Women's Singles